Open Babel is computer software, a chemical expert system mainly used to interconvert chemical file formats.

About
Due to the strong relationship to informatics this program belongs more to the category cheminformatics than to molecular modelling. It is available for Windows, Unix, Linux, macOS, and Android. It is free and open-source software released under a GNU General Public License (GPL) 2.0.

The project's stated goal is:
"Open Babel is a community-driven scientific project assisting both users and developers as a cross-platform program and library designed to support molecular modeling, chemistry, and many related areas, including interconversion of file formats and data."

History
Open Babel and JOELib were derived from the OELib cheminformatics library. In turn, OELib was based on ideas in the original chemistry program Babel and an unreleased object-oriented programming library called OBabel.

Major features
 chemical expert system
 interconversion of many chemical file formats
 substructure search, based on simplified molecular-input line-entry system (SMILES)
 fingerprint calculation
 3D coordinate generation
 wrappers for Python, Perl, Java, Ruby, C#

See also

 Avogadro – molecular builder and editor based on Open Babel
 Ghemical – molecular mechanics program based on Open Babel
 JOELib – Java version of Open Babel and OELib
 XDrawChem – 2D drawing program based on Open Babel
 Comparison of software for molecular mechanics modeling
 Blue Obelisk
List of free and open-source software packages

References

External links
 
 E-BABEL – interactive version of the Open Babel at Virtual Computational Chemistry Laboratory
 chemCast Episode 003 – project lead developer Geoff Hutchison was interviewed on the podcast

Computational chemistry software
Free chemistry software
Free software programmed in C++
Chemistry software for Linux
Software that uses wxWidgets
File conversion software
2005 software